Azteca australis is a species of ant in the genus Azteca. Described by Wheeler in 1942, the species is endemic to various countries in South America.

References

Azteca (genus)
Hymenoptera of South America
Insects described in 1942